Changchun Stadium, also known as Nanling Stadium, is a multi-purpose stadium in Changchun, Jilin, China. It is predominantly used for football matches.  The stadium holds 38,500.  It is currently the home of Changchun Yatai of the Chinese Super League.

See also
 Sports in China

References

Buildings and structures in Changchun
Football venues in China
Athletics (track and field) venues in China
Sport in Changchun
Multi-purpose stadiums in China
Sports venues in Jilin